The Psychedelic Sounds of the 13th Floor Elevators is the debut studio album by the 13th Floor Elevators. The album's sound, featuring elements of psychedelia, hard rock, garage rock, folk, and blues, is notable for its use of the electric jug, as featured on the band's only hit, "You're Gonna Miss Me", which reached number 55 on the Billboard Charts with "Tried to Hide" as a B-side. Another single from the album, "Reverberation (Doubt)", reached number 129 on the Billboard's Bubbling Under Chart.

Background
The October 1966 back cover of the album uses the words "The Psychedelic Sounds of: The 13th Floor Elevators", which is purported to be the first use of the word "psychedelic" in reference to the music within. Two other bands also used the word in titles of LPs released in November 1966: The Blues Magoos' Psychedelic Lollipop, and the Deep's Psychedelic Moods.

In 2009, the original mono version was released as part of the "Sign of the 3-Eyed Men" box set. The set also featured a new, alternate stereo version which retained the band's original intended track listing, as well as false starts on some of the tracks (the International Artists label had altered the track listing without the band's consent when the album was first released). Both versions on the box set featured different bonus tracks, some that were previously unreleased.

Critical reception

The album was included in Robert Dimery's 1001 Albums You Must Hear Before You Die.

Track listing

Tracks 12-17 were recorded live at the Avalon in San Francisco, September 1966
Tracks 18-19 were recorded live in Texas
Tracks 20-21 were The Spades singles released in 1965

This version was included in the "Sign of the 3-Eyed Men" box set on CD 4 with the following bonus tracks.

Personnel
 Roky Erickson – vocals, rhythm guitar, harmonica
 Stacy Sutherland – lead guitar
 Tommy Hall – amplified jug
 Benny Thurman – bass (1, 3)
 Ronnie Leatherman – bass (2, 4-11)
 John Ike Walton – drums, percussion

Production
 Produced by Lelan Rogers, except track 1 produced by Gordon Bynum
 Recorded, engineered & mixed by Bob Sullivan
John Cleveland - cover design

See also
 Nuggets: Original Artyfacts from the First Psychedelic Era, 1965–1968

References

External links

 The Psychedelic Sounds of the 13th Floor Elevators (Adobe Flash) at Radio3Net (streamed copy where licensed)
 The Psychedelic Sounds of the 13th Floor Elevators at Discogs

The 13th Floor Elevators albums
1966 debut albums
Radar Records albums
Charly Records albums
Fuel 2000 albums
International Artists albums